Shutty Bench is a small rural community about  north of Kaslo in the West Kootenay region of southeastern British Columbia. The former steamboat landing is at the mouth of Shutty Creek on the western shore of Kootenay Lake.

Name origin
In 1897 or 1898, Andrew Shutty arrived, claimed approximately 500 acres, built a log house, and farmed. Following a forest fire, which swept through soon afterward, the benchland was subdivided and sold to newly arriving Slovaks. The earliest known newspaper mention of Shutty Bench is 1909. Some called the place British Bench, perhaps in jest, after an influx of British settlers. Ronda, Rhonda, or Rhonda Beach were also used at the time, but most likely identify the beach itself, the primary access point. On the Canadian Pacific Railway (CP) lake boat timetables for 1923–1956, Schuletty was the spelling of the stop.

Early community
All the habitable land on the bench and waterfront was claimed or purchased prior to World War I. Drawn by CP publicity, many came from England with dreams of establishing a commercial orchard. However, the lengthy time for an apple orchard to mature and bear fruit, and the ultimate glut of producers, proved disappointing. The apple and cherry orchards that did develop in the area steadily diminished. During the 1930s and 1940s, a community club organized dances, cards parties, and social events. After the school closed in 1946, students were bussed to Kaslo. The demolition of the schoolhouse in 1950, ended the community club, reducing Shutty Bench to a Kaslo suburb.

Transportation & roads
In the early years, lake steamers or small boats provided the only access. In 1909 or 1910 the wagon road from Kaslo opened, and in 1911 was extended through the scattered community. However, walking to and from Kaslo was common. In 1912, the federal government built the public wharf, an essential link prior to the Nelson–Kaslo road opening in 1927. For convenience, steamboats continued to pull up at the beach closest to the consignee when delivering freight . The lake service frequency steadily reduced, being only once weekly prior to ceasing in 1957.

Many residents settled their property taxes by working with picks, shovels and wheelbarrows on road maintenance. Prior to World War II, a horse-drawn wooden plow cleared snow from roads during winter. Later, a mechanical grader took over this function.

Present community
Properties serve as weekend retreats or as a bedroom community for Nelson. Resorts, guest houses, cabins and camping facilities cater to visitors. An operation such as the Lakewood Inn, which opened cabins around 1930, has expanded under subsequent owners.

References

Populated places in the West Kootenay